Chalcos is one of 11 districts of the Sucre Province in the Ayacucho region in Peru.

Population
The population of Chalcos is 748 people, 376 men and 372 women.

Ethnic groups 
The people in the district are mainly indigenous citizens of Quechua descent. Quechua is the language which the majority of the population (81.70%) learnt to speak in childhood, 18.16% of the residents started speaking using the Spanish language (2007 Peru Census).

Administrative division
The populated places in the district are:
 Chalcos
 Urpayhuasi
 Camapuyo
 Corral Pata
 Huasacapo
 Pueblo Nuevo
 Ccochanccay
 Pamparca
 Chuncuni
 Tranca
 Illahuasi
 Ayalca Ankara

References